South Korea participated in the 2014 Asian Beach Games in Phuket, Thailand from 14 to 23 November 2014.

South Korea also won 9 gold medals, 14 silver medals, 14 bronze medals and a total of 37 medals, finishing third on the medal table.

Competitors

Medal summary

Medal by sport

Medal by Date

External links 
Competition Schedule
(All Sports) NOC - Overview South Korea

References

Nations at the 2014 Asian Beach Games
2014
Asian Beach Games